The name Noctilux is used by Leica to designate their camera lenses with the widest maximum aperture. Lenses with that name have been in production since 1966. So far all Noctilux lenses have been made for the Leica M mount.

History
The name Noctilux is a combination of Nocti, which is derived from the word nocturnal, while Lux is Latin for light.

Description
The Noctilux lenses have the largest maximum apertures in the Leica range. With various models having f-numbers of f/0.95 or f/1.0 or f/1.2 or f/1.25 as its maximum aperture. It is also the heaviest of all of Leica's lenses.

Market position
The Noctilux is the most expensive lens in the Leica lens range. It is followed by the Summilux.

List of Noctilux lenses
For the Leica M mount

References

External links

Leica lenses
Photographic lenses